Samuel Agba (born 12 June 1986) is a Nigerian former professional footballer who played as a midfielder.

Career
Agba started his professional career in Denmark with Akademisk Boldklub, after having joined from Togolese club Entente Lomé, where he was known under the name Amindi Kalu. A short loan to Ølstykke followed in 2007, before signing with Esbjerg fB in 2008. He joined BSV in January 2009. In January 2012 he began playing lower-level football with Greve Fodbold. In July 2012 he signed a contract with FC Helsingør. He then played for BSV again between 2013 and 2014.

Style of play
A predominantly left-footed player, Agba has been described as technically skilled and physically strong, with a high work-rate, who was able to cover several positions.

References

1986 births
Living people
Sportspeople from Oyo State
Nigerian expatriate footballers
Nigerian footballers
Danish Superliga players
Danish 1st Division players
Danish 2nd Division players
Akademisk Boldklub players
Ølstykke FC players
Esbjerg fB players
FC Helsingør players
Greve Fodbold players
BK Søllerød-Vedbæk players
Skovshoved IF players
Association football midfielders
Expatriate men's footballers in Denmark
Nigerian expatriate sportspeople in Denmark